Dulles Town Center is a two-level enclosed shopping mall in Sterling in Loudoun County, Virginia. It is part of the Dulles Town Center census-designated place for population statistical purposes. Dulles Town Center is anchored by the traditional chains Dick's Sporting Goods, JCPenney, and Macy's. It features typical mall staples such as Books-A-Million, American Eagle, Aeropostale, PacSun, Hollister Co., and  Ann Taylor.

It encompasses  of gross leasable area and is the sole enclosed shopping center in Loudoun County. The mall serves a wide geographic area, drawing customers from Loudoun, Fairfax, Clarke, and Frederick counties in Virginia, as well as Jefferson County, West Virginia.

History
In December 1987, Loudoun County officials approved the jurisdiction's first regional shopping mall, to be developed in a joint venture between Lerner Enterprises and Cigna. The mall was originally planned to be named the "Windmill Regional Shopping Center" but took its present name a year later.

Construction did not commence until years later, due to the nationwide recession. It was eventually scheduled to begin construction in spring 1994, with a planned opening date of 1996, but this timeline never came to fruition.

Construction did ultimately begin in 1996, with a target completion date of spring 1998.

Delays further pushed the opening back to November 1998, with its first two anchor stores (Hecht's and Lord & Taylor) opening November 18, 1998. JCPenney and Sears opened in late Spring 1999, with the official grand-opening commencing August 12, 1999.

Another wing was added in 2002, anchored by Nordstrom as well as a two-level access corridor of various stores.

Around the same an Edwards Cinema was proposed for the adjoining area. An LA Fitness and a relocated Dick's Sporting Goods later filled this space.

An office building was attached to the Sears wing during this period, but was later razed for a Regal Cinemas Multiplex.

Hecht's became Macy's with their buyout of May Department Stores in 2006.

The later 2010's saw multiple traditional chain anchors update their brick and mortar fleets after being disrupted by digital retailers in recent years.

On June 30, 2017, it was announced Nordstrom was not renewing their operating agreement due to the number of additional outposts nearby.

On August 27, 2020, Lord & Taylor announced it would shutter its brick-and-mortar fleet after modernizing into a digital collective department store.

On February 2, 2021, it was announced that Sears would shutter as part of an ongoing plan to phase out of brick-and-mortar.

In November 2020, Lerner Enterprises sold the mall and surrounding properties to Centennial Real Estate of Dallas, Texas. Centennial announced it was eying the center for a future mixed-use redevelopment.

Anchors

Current
JCPenney (since 1999)
Macy's (since 2006)
Dick's Sporting Goods (since 2004)

Former
Hecht's (1998-2006)
Nordstrom (2002-2017)
Lord & Taylor (1998-2020)
Sears (1999-2021)

Dining 
The mall features a large food court in the center court upper level featuring numerous fast food restaurants. The backside of the mall property also has several pad sites featuring many National chain restaurants. The front center entrance to the mall features a Cheesecake Factory.

References

External links 

 Dulles Town Center

1998 establishments in Virginia
Buildings and structures in Loudoun County, Virginia
Shopping malls established in 1998
Shopping malls in Virginia
Shopping malls in the Washington metropolitan area